Birtavarre is a village in the municipality of Gáivuotna-Kåfjord-Kaivuono in Troms og Finnmark county, Norway.  The village is located along the Kåfjordelva river at the end of the Kåfjorden in the Kåfjorddalen valley in an area called Kåfjordbotn.

Birtavarre Chapel is also located in the village.

Name
Birtavarre is a former mining town with smelters in Ankerlia that are preserved by the Nord-Troms Museum.  It was during the mining period that the village adopted the name Birtavarre.  Up until that time the area had been called Kåfjordbotn, meaning the end of the Kåfjorden.  Since there was also mining in Kåfjord in the nearby Alta Municipality, many workers ended up in the wrong Kåfjord.  The name was changed simply for the practical reason of avoiding confusion. The Sámi name for the place, Gáivuonbahta, is translated from the old name Kåfjordbotn. The present name for the village comes from the nearby mountain Pirttivaara which is a Kven language name.

References

Gáivuotna–Kåfjord
Villages in Troms
Populated places of Arctic Norway